1st Brigade is one of two Infantry brigades of the Slovenian Armed Forces and provides combat forces. The other is the 72nd Brigade, which provides combat support forces.

History 

It was formed on 17 December 1998.

Organization 
 January 2004
 Command-Logistics Company
 10th Motorized Battalion
 20th Motorized Battalion
 17th Military Police Battalion
 670th Command-Logistics Battalion

 July 2004
 Command
 10th Motorized Battalion 
 20th Motorized Battalion 
 17th Military Police Battalion
 Detachment for Special Warfare

 April 2008
 Command
 10th Motorized Battalion
 20th Motorized Battalion
 74th Armoured-Mechanized Battalion
 670th Command-Logistics Battalion

 May 2008
 Command
 10th Motorized Battalion
 20th Motorized Battalion
 74th Motorized Battalion
 670th Command-Logistics Battalion

June 2013
Command
10th Infantry Regiment
132nd Mountain Infantry Regiment
Territorial Regiment
Combat Support Battalion
Light Rocket Air Defense Battery
Fire Support Battery
Nuclear, Biological and Chemical Defense Company
Signals Company
Engineer Company
Anti-Tank Company
Intelligence and Reconnaissance Company
Military Police Company

References

Brigades of Slovenia